Lunds Boxningsällskap or Lunds BS is a successful boxing club in Lund, Sweden, founded in 1941. The club has produced Swedish Champions and a World Champion. The club is located in Idrottshallen by Högevallsbadet in Lund. Per-Arne Ljung is the head coach.

World Champions 
 2001, 2005 Anna Laurell

Swedish Champions 
 2001, 2002, 2004 Said El-Tahan 
 2001, 2003, 2006, 2008 Anna Laurell

References

External links 
 Lunds Boxningssällskap

Sports teams in Sweden
Sports clubs established in 1941
Sport in Lund